

Events
Timothy "Big Tim" Sullivan, longtime political boss of Tammany Hall, is committed to a sanitarium.
Mock Duck is convicted of running a policy game and sentenced to imprisonment at Sing Sing Prison.
July 15 – Members of the Lenox Avenue Gang including leader Harry Horowitz, known as Gyp the Blood, and top lieutenants Jacob Seidenscher, Louis Rosenberg, and Francesco Cirofici kill prominent New York gambler and police informant Herman "Beansie" Rosenthal. They are later convicted of Rosenthal's murder and executed the same year.
September – Republican State's Attorney John E.W. Wayman, shortly before his term of office is to expire, officially closes down Chicago's South Side "Levee District". The long-time vice district had been a hotbed of criminal activity for Chicago's underworld, as well as a major source of political power for Chicago's First Ward aldermen, such as Michael "Hinky Dink" Kenna and "Bathhouse" John Coughlin, since the 1890s.
October 19 – Frank Costello is again arrested for assault and robbery and is later released.
October 5 – Eastman Gang leader Jack Zelig is killed by "Red" Phil Davidson on a Second Avenue street car trolley.
November 6 – Owney Madden is shot by several thugs while at a 52nd Street dance in New York.

Arts and literature
D.W. Griffith's The Musketeers of Pig Alley is released starring Elmer Booth, Lillian Gish, Clara T. Bracy and Walter Miller.

Births
 January 8 – Joseph N. Gallo, alleged consigliere of Gambino crime family bosses Carlo Gambino, Paul Castellano and John Gotti
 March 19 – Nicholas Civella, Kansas City crime family boss
 April 12 – Jack "Spot" Comer, Jewish-English gangster
 September 18 – John T. Scalish, Cleveland crime family boss and National Crime Syndicate labor racketeer
 December 28 – William Daddano Sr., Chicago Outfit enforcer

Deaths
July 15 – Herman "Beansie" Rosenthal, New York gambler and police informant
October 5 – Jack Zelig, Eastman Gang leader

References 

Years in organized crime
Organized crime